The Sheffield and Midland Railway Companies' Committee was incorporated by Act of Parliament in 1869 as a joint venture between the Midland Railway and the Manchester, Sheffield and Lincolnshire Railway.

Origins
For many years the Midland had been wishing to extend its line from London St.Pancras to Manchester, via Derby and the Manchester, Buxton, Matlock and Midlands Junction Railway.

It was thwarted by the London and North Western Railway which already had a line from Manchester to London, via Birmingham and had built a branch line to Buxton. Meanwhile,  The Great Northern Railway was also averse to more competition in the area, and the MS&LR wished to expand southwards from its main line from Manchester, via Penistone, to Sheffield. The three joined forces in a series of tripartite agreements, which not being sanctioned by Parliament, were of doubtful legality.

However James Allport, with some other Midland directors, met some members of the MS&L board while surveying the area. Allport had worked for the MS&LR and was familiar with the state of their finances. Since it was clear that the Midland was determined to enter Manchester, the MS&LR agreed to a joint scheme. The Midland would take its line from Millers Dale as far as New Mills, and the MS&LR would build its branch from Hyde on its main line to Hayfield via New Mills.

Opening
This agreement, including the Sheffield and Midland railway companies' Committee, was formalised in the "Manchester, Sheffield and Lincolnshire Railway Act" of 6 August 1872 

In 1867 the line opened into Manchester Store Street, by then renamed London Road (now Piccadilly), which the MS&LR shared with the LNWR. However, the Committee, seeking a more direct route, opened a line through Bredbury and Reddish in 1875.

Increasing friction with LNWR led to the Cheshire Lines Committee being formed and when Manchester Central opened in 1880 trains were diverted at Romiley through Stockport Teviot Dale (as it was originally spelt).

This entailed another new line, the "Manchester South District Railway Company" from Heaton Mersey to Chorlton-cum-Hardy. Although incorporated in 1873, there was a lack of interest on the part of the MS&LR and the GNR (the Midland's partners in the CLC). It was therefore taken under the wing of the Sheffield and Midland Committee, with the Midland taking overall control in 1877. The line finally opened in 1880.

However, by the end of the century congestion around Stockport had increased, and with speed limits, gradients and curves, the Midland looked for yet another route. The "New Mills and Heaton Mersey Railway" was authorised in 1897 from New Mills South Junction, between New Mills and Buxworth through Disley Tunnel.

Modern times
The earlier lines remain busy as the Hope Valley Line, as does that from New Mills through Disley Tunnel, where it branches to the old LNWR line from Buxton at Hazel Grove railway station into Stockport. However the stations from Hazel Grove to Manchester Central closed in 1967 and have practically disappeared, although the section of the railway between Didsbury and Manchester Central has reopened as a Metrolink line. There are hopes that this will extend further in the future through Heaton Mersey, and then leaving the alignment and heading into Stockport town centre.

It became a corporate body, renamed the Great Central and Midland Joint Committee, on 22 July 1904. It was vested in British Transport Commission under Transport Act of 1947.

See also
 Great Central and Midland Joint Railway

References

Early British railway companies
British joint railway companies
Rail transport in Derbyshire
Railway companies established in 1869
Railway lines opened in 1875
1869 establishments in England